Elizabeth Anne Clark (born 6 November 1953 in Adelaide, South Australia), is an Australian former politician with the Labor Party in the Queensland Legislature who held the seat for Clayfield and also an actress of television and film, director, producer and presenter, credited as Liddy Clark and Liddy Clarke.

Acting career

She has various credits in film and television to her name. 

Film credits include Mad Dog Morgan, Blue Fin, The Chant of Jimmie Blacksmith, Touch and Go, Kitty and the Bagman and Annie's Coming Out.

She is possibly best known for her two small screen roles in the cult series Prisoner. She played child killer Bella Albrecht for two episodes in 1979 and Sharon Smart, the victim of a crooked religious cult, for six episodes in 1983.

In 1988, Clark played the role of battered wife Kerry Barlow in Home and Away.
She was a regular cast member in the series Fire and has also made guest appearances in Cop Shop, Matlock Police, The Sullivans, Kingswood Country, A Country Practice  and Echo Point, she also featured in the Prisoner re-imaging series Wentworth. She was a presenter on the long-running children's program Play School.

Political career
In 2001 she defeated Santo Santoro in the normally safe Liberal seat of Clayfield in the Legislative Assembly of Queensland.  Even allowing for the massive Labor wave that swept through the state in that election, Clark's election was considered a shock result.

She was briefly Minister for Indigenous Affairs in the government of Peter Beattie, She was involved in the so-called "Winegate" affair.  A bottle of wine was taken aboard a government jet travelling to a "dry" indigenous community in North Queensland.  Two of Clark's staff were moved from their jobs over the affair, and after an independent inquiry Clark was cleared of any wrongdoing.

She lost the seat, the most marginal in Queensland, at the 2006 Election.

Filmography

TELEVISION

References

External links
 Personal website
 

1953 births
Living people
Actresses from Adelaide
Australian film actresses
Australian soap opera actresses
Members of the Queensland Legislative Assembly
Women members of the Queensland Legislative Assembly
Australian children's television presenters
Politicians from Adelaide
21st-century Australian politicians
21st-century Australian women politicians
Australian women television presenters